The Trafalgar School at Downton is a Coeducational secondary school located in Downton in the English county of Wiltshire.
 
The school began as a secondary modern in 1964. Previously a foundation school administered by Wiltshire Council, in April 2017 The Trafalgar School converted to academy status and is now sponsored by the Magna Learning Partnership.

References

External links
 The Trafalgar School at Downton official website

Secondary schools in Wiltshire
Academies in Wiltshire
International Baccalaureate schools in England
1964 establishments in England
Educational institutions established in 1964